A Fitness Report (FITREP) is an evaluation form used by the United States Navy and United States Marine Corps.  Navy officers are given Fitness Reports, while Navy chief petty officers (E-7 to E-9) are given "Chief EVALs" and Navy sailors E-6 and below are issued Evaluation Reports (EVALs).  Marine enlisted from the rank of sergeant (E-5) to sergeant major/ master gunnery sergeant (E-9) and officers are given Fitness Reports, while junior Marines are given Proficiency and Conduct marks ("Pros/Cons").

The United States Air Force equivalents are the Enlisted Performance Report (EPR) and Officer Performance Report.  The United States Army equivalents are the Enlisted Evaluation Report (EER) and Officer Evaluation Report.  The Navy uses the same format for senior enlisted as officers because of the special role that chief petty officers play in the Navy.  Similarly chief petty officers also wear the same uniforms, with appropriate rank insignia, as officers.

External links 
 US Navy Officer Fitness Report form
 US Air Force Officer Evaluation
 US Army Personnel Evaluation Reporting System
United States Navy